The Renzi government was the 63rd government of the Italian Republic, in office from February 2014 to December 2016. It was led by Matteo Renzi, secretary and leader of the centre-left Democratic Party (PD).

The government was composed of members of the PD together with the New Centre-Right (NCD), the Union of the Centre (UdC), Civic Choice (SC), the Populars for Italy (PpI, until June 2015), Solidary Democracy (Demo.S, since July 2014), the Italian Socialist Party (PSI), Democratic Centre (CD, since October 2015) and non-party independents. At its formation, the Renzi government was the youngest government of Italy to date, with an average age of forty-seven, and the youngest-ever Prime Minister. It was also the first Italian government in which the number of female ministers was equal to the number of male ministers, not including the prime minister; that later changed, as eventually three female ministers resigned, each replaced by a male minister.

On 19 April 2016, the Senate rejected two motions of no confidence against the government following the "Tempa Rossa scandal"; the first one (entered by the Five Star Movement) was defeated with a 96–183 votes, while the second one (entered by Forza Italia, Northern League and Conservative and Reformists) was defeated with a 93–180 vote.

History

At a meeting on 13 February 2014, following tensions between Prime Minister Enrico Letta and PD Secretary Matteo Renzi, the Democratic Party leadership voted heavily in favour of Renzi's call for "a new government, a new phase and a radical programme of reform". Minutes after the Party backed the Renzi proposal by 136 votes to 16, with two abstentions, Palazzo Chigi – the official residence of the Prime Minister – announced that Letta would travel to the Quirinale the following day to tender his resignation to President Giorgio Napolitano.

In an earlier speech, Renzi had paid tribute to Letta, saying that he was not intended to put him "on trial". But, without directly proposing himself as the next Prime Minister, he said the Eurozone's third-largest economy urgently needed "a new phase" and "radical programme" to push through badly-needed reforms. The motion he put forward made clear "the necessity and urgency of opening a new phase with a new executive". Speaking privately to party leaders, Renzi said that Italy was "at a crossroads" and faced either holding fresh elections or a new government without a return to the polls. On 14 February, President Napolitano accepted Letta's resignation from the office of Prime Minister.

Following Letta's resignation, Renzi formally received the task of forming a new government from President Napolitano on 17 February. Renzi held several days of talks with party leaders, all of which he broadcast live on the internet, before unveiling his government on 21 February, which contained members of his Democratic Party, the New Centre-Right, the Union of the Centre and Civic Choice. His government became Italy's youngest government to date, with an average age of 47. It was also the first in which the number of female ministers was equal to the number of male ministers, excluding the Prime Minister.

The following day Renzi was formally sworn in as Prime Minister, becoming the youngest Prime Minister in the history of Italy. His rise to become Prime Minister was widely seen as a sign of much-needed generational change, and at the time he took office he enjoyed by far the highest approval rating of any politician in the country.

On 25 February Renzi won a vote of confidence in the Italian Parliament, with 169 votes in the Senate and 378 in the Chamber of Deputies.

On 20 March 2015, Prime Minister Renzi became ad interim Minister of Infrastructure and Transport after the resignation of Maurizio Lupi, due to a corruption scandal involving public works on infrastructure, in which his name was cited several times. Renzi hold the office until 2 April, when Graziano Delrio was appointed as new minister.

Investiture votes

Party breakdown

Beginning of term

Ministers

Ministers and other members
 Democratic Party (PD): Prime minister, 8 ministers, 4 deputy ministers, 21 undersecretaries
 New Centre-Right (NCD): 3 ministers, 2 deputy ministers, 7 undersecretaries
 Civic Choice (SC): 1 minister, 1 deputy minister, 3 undersecretaries
 Union of the Centre (UdC): 1 minister
 Populars for Italy (PpI): 1 deputy minister, 3 undersecretaries
 Italian Socialist Party (PSI): 1 deputy minister
 Independents: 3 ministers, 5 undersecretaries

End of term

Ministers

Ministers and other members
 Democratic Party (PD): Prime minister, 9 ministers, 3 deputy ministers, 23 undersecretaries
 New Centre-Right (NCD): 3 ministers, 1 deputy minister, 9 undersecretaries
 Union of the Centre (UdC): 1 minister
 Solidary Democracy (Demo.S): 2 deputy ministers
 Civic Choice (SC): 1 deputy minister
 Italian Socialist Party (PSI): 1 deputy minister
 Democratic Centre (CD): 1 undersecretary
 Civics and Innovators (CI): 1 undersecretary
 Independents: 3 ministers, 1 deputy minister, 4 undersecretaries

Geographical breakdown

Beginning of term
 Northern Italy: 8 ministers
 Emilia-Romagna: 4 ministers
 Lombardy: 2 ministers
 Liguria: 2 ministers
 Central Italy: 7 ministers (incl. Renzi)
 Lazio: 4 ministers
 Tuscany: 3 ministers
 Southern and Insular Italy: 2 ministers
 Sicily: 1 minister
 Calabria: 1 minister

Final breakdown
 Northern Italy: 8 ministers
 Emilia-Romagna: 4 ministers
 Liguria: 2 ministers
 Piedmont: 1 minister
 Lombardy: 1 minister
 Central Italy: 8 ministers (incl. Renzi)
 Lazio: 5 ministers
 Tuscany: 3 ministers
 Southern and Insular Italy: 1 minister
 Sicily: 1 minister

Council of Ministers

Composition

Chronology

February 2014 
On 14 February 2014, the Italian Prime Minister Enrico Letta, taking note of the approval by a large majority by the Central Committee of the Democratic Party of a proposal by the Democratic Party Secretary Renzi to give life to a new government, tendered his irrevocable resignation to the President of the Italian Republic Giorgio Napolitano, who accepted it and gave life immediately to consultations with speakers of the House of Deputies and of the Senate, as well as with delegations of MPs for each political party.  The Northern League Party and the Five Star Movement decide not to take part in such consultations.

On 17 February 2014, the President of the Republic assigned the task of forming a new government to the Secretary of the Democratic Party Matteo Renzi, who reserved the right to accept, also informing the Speakers of both Houses.
On 18 February 2014 and 19 February 2014 the Prime Minister held consultations with the parliamentary groups of both Houses of Parliament.
On 21 February 2014, Matteo Renzi went to the President of the Republic and communicated his decision to become Prime Minister, presenting a list of 16 Ministers.

On 22 February 2014, Matteo Renzi and 15 ministers took the oath before the President of the Republic at the Quirinale Palace.  After the handover with the former Prime Minister Enrico Letta, Renzi presided over the first government meeting, in which the Ministers without portfolio were assigned their briefs and Graziano Delrio was appointed Under-Secretary of State at the Prime Minister's Office, as well as Cabinet Secretary.

On 24 February 2014, Prime Minister Renzi presented his Government's program in the Senate and, after almost 11 hours of debate, his government obtained the Senate's vote of confidence, with 169 voting in favor and 139 against.
On 25 February 2014, the government also obtained the vote of confidence vote of the House of Deputies, with 378 votes in favour, 220 against and 1 abstention.

On 28 February 2014, the Italian government appointed forty four under-secretaries, who in the evening took the oath before Prime Minister Matteo Renzi.

March 2014 

On 3 March 2014, after several days of controversy, the new Under Secretary for Infrastructures and Transports, Antonio Gentile tendered his resignation.

On 12 March 2014, after two days of voting, the Chamber of Deputies approved in first reading the new electoral law Italicum with 365 votes in favour, 156 against and 40 abstentions. A number of controversies surrounded the failure to introduce preferential votes favouring gender equality.

On 12 March 2014, the Italian government issued a law- decree on fixed-term contracts, called the Poletti Decree, as well as a Bill proposing a reform on the Italian labor market called "Jobs Act"  A reduction in the tax burden of about €80 was announced for those earning less than 1500 Euros per month.

On 26 March 2014, despite the controversy raised by several parties belonging to the majority coalition, the government won a confidence vote in the Senate on the Delrio Bill reforming the provinces, with 160 voting in favour and 133 against. Subsequently, the Chamber of Deputies approved the Bill on 3 April 2014.

April 2014 

On 18 April 2014, the Italian government approved a law-decree which provided for the reduction of Income Tax for employees and assimilated workers earning up to €24,000 gross per year. The net monthly salary was foreseen to increase by €80, through a tax credit from the month of May 2014.

On 30 April 2014, Matteo Renzi, together with the Minister for the Public Administration Marianna Madia, presented the guidelines for the reform of the Public Administration, subsequently approved by the government on 13 June 2014.

May 2014 

On 6 May 2014, the Constitutional Affairs Committee of the Senate approved the Government's Bill on the reform of the Italian Senate.

On 21 May 2014, an agreement was signed between the Government, Sardinia Region and the Qatar Foundation to bring €1 billion investment and thousands of jobs to Sardinia.

On 22 May 2014, the Italian government of Ministers approved the Law-decree on culture for the preservation of the Italian historic, artistic and cultural heritage.

On 25 May 2014, the Democratic Party, which was the main supporter of the government and was also the party of the Prime Minister Matteo Renzi, won the 2014 European elections with 40.81% of the votes.

August 2014 

On 1 August 2014, the Italian Prime Minister Matteo Renzi explained in a press conference the guidelines of Law-decree called "Sblocca Italia" or "Unlock Italy", which, in the intentions of the Government, is to facilitate the implementation of major projects, civil works and infrastructure that are currently suspended, as well as achieve further administrative simplification. A month of public consultations would take place in relation to such guidelines.

On 8 August 2014, the Italian government approved a law-decree contrasting the phenomenon of lawlessness and violence at sporting events and provided for the international protection of migrants.

On 8 August 2014, the Senate approved the constitutional reform proposed by the government with 183 votes in favour, and 4 abstentions.

On 8 August 2014, the two Houses of Parliament approved of the decrees on Competitiveness, Public Administration and Prisons, which become law.

On 29 August 2014, the Italian government approved the "Unblock Italy" Law-Decree and Justice Reform, dividing it into a Law-Decree for the disposal of the backlog in civil proceedings, and Law-Decrees relating to the fight against organized crime and illegal assets, the civil liability of judges, the efficiency of civil trials, as well as a comprehensive reform of the judiciary and a reform of Book XI of the Italian Code of criminal Procedure.

September 2014 

On 1 September 2014, the Italian Prime Minister explained in a press conference that the site "passodopopasso.italia.it" would allow citizens to monitor the progress of the government's program.

On 3 September 2014, the "Millegiorni" website provided guidelines on the reform of the school that will be subject to consultation for two months.

October 2014 

On 8 October 2014, the Italian Senate approved the so-called Jobs Act, with 165 voting in favour and 111 against. The provision was criticized by the CGIL trade union and the Senators Felice Casson, Corradino Mineo and Lucrezia Ricchiuti , who did not take part in the vote.

On 8 October 2014, the Italian Prime Minister presented the Italian Finance Bill (or Legge di Stabilità).

December 2014 

Following approval of the Jobs Act by the Italian Parliament (Delegation Law No. 183 10 December 2014), the Italian government issued on 24 December 2014, the first legislative decree concerning contracts with growing protection.

References

External links 
 

 
2014 establishments in Italy
2016 disestablishments in Italy
Italian governments
Cabinets established in 2014
Cabinets disestablished in 2016